Dichomeris ochroxesta is a moth in the family Gelechiidae. It was described by Edward Meyrick in 1921. It is found in South Africa.

The wingspan is about 17 mm. The forewings are yellow ochreous, somewhat paler towards the costa anteriorly. The hindwings are grey.

References

Endemic moths of South Africa
Moths described in 1921
ochroxesta